The 2016 United States House of Representatives elections in Wisconsin were held on Tuesday, November 8, 2016, to elect the eight U.S. representatives from the state of Wisconsin, one from each of the state's eight congressional districts. The elections coincided with the elections of other federal and state offices, including President of the United States and U.S. Senator from Wisconsin. The primaries were held on August 9.

District 1

Republican Paul Ryan had represented the district since being elected in 1998.  From October 29, 2015 until his retirement in 2019 he sat as the Speaker of the House.

Republican primary
Declared
 Paul Ryan, incumbent
 Paul Nehlen, senior vice-president of operations at Neptune-Benson

Campaign
Nehlen filed campaign papers to run against Speaker of the House Paul Ryan on April 1, 2016, and officially launched his campaign on April 14, with the opening of his first campaign office in Kenosha, Wisconsin. Nehlen claims to have been a Paul Ryan supporter and worked for his election in earlier campaigns but at least one conservative media report has questioned that claim.

According to a Janesville Gazette report about his campaign launch, "Nehlen declined to talk about issues such as abortion and would not say what presidential candidate he supports or whether he would support a Republican running for the presidency." Nehlen ran on a platform calling for secure borders, enforcement of existing immigration laws, and reduced government spending, and he opposed the Trans-Pacific Partnership treaty. On May 5, 2016, Nehlen pledged to support Donald Trump for the presidency.

The Milwaukee Journal Sentinel reported on July 14, 2016, that Nehlen had hired Dan Backer as his campaign treasurer. Backer is nationally known for his fundraising activities.

In an August 2016 radio interview, Nehlen suggested that the United States should "have a discussion" about the possibility of deporting Sharia-adherent Muslims living in the country. The remark occurred when Nehlen was asked about his thoughts regarding the dispute between 2016 Republican presidential candidate Donald Trump and Khizr and Ghazala Khan, the parents of Humayun Khan, an American Muslim Army captain who died in a suicide bombing while serving in Iraq in 2004. During the interview, Nehlen also said that every mosque in the United States should be monitored for signs of potential radicalization.

Because of Nehlen's support for Trump, Trump publicly thanked him on Twitter and later told The Washington Post that Nehlen was "running a very good campaign", even though he did not endorse him. On August 5, 2016, Trump endorsed Ryan's re-election after pressure from fellow Republican leaders.

Nehlen lost the Republican Party primary to Ryan. Ryan received 84 percent of the votes, while Nehlen received 16 percent.

Endorsements

Results

Democratic primary
Declared
 Tom Breu, plumbing engineer
 Ryan Solen, Democratic Party of Wisconsin Veteran's Caucus Secretary/Treasurer

Declined
 Rob Zerban, 2012 and 2014 Democratic nominee

Results

Libertarian primary
Jason Lebeck, I.T. technician, ran as a Libertarian.

Results

Independents
 Spencer Zimmerman, appears on the ballot as "Trump Conservative"

General election

Results

District 2

Democrat Mark Pocan had represented the district since being elected in 2012.

Democratic primary

Results

Republican primary
Declared
Peter Theron, the Republican nominee in 2008 and 2014, announced he would run again as a Republican in 2016.

Results

General election

Results

District 3

Democrat Ron Kind had represented the district since 1996.

Democratic primary
Declared
 Ron Kind, incumbent
 Myron Buchholz, retired teacher

Results

General election

Results

District 4

Democrat Gwen Moore had represented the district since being elected in 2004.

Dan Sebring, the GOP nominee every cycle since 2008, announced he would not run again in 2016.

Democratic primary
Declared
Gwen Moore, incumbent
Gary George, former state senator

Results

Libertarian primary

Candidates

Declared
Andy Craig, political activist and 2014 candidate for Secretary of State of Wisconsin

Results

General election

Results

District 5

Republican James Sensenbrenner had represented the district since being elected in 1978.

Republican primary

Results

Democratic primary
Khary Penebaker ran as a Democrat.

Results

Libertarian primary
John Arndt ran as a Libertarian.

Results

General election

Results

District 6

Republican Glenn Grothman had represented the district since being elected in 2014.

Republican primary

Results

Democratic primary

Candidates
Declared
Sarah Lloyd, farmer
Michael Slattery, farmer

Results

General election

Results

District 7

Republican Sean Duffy had represented the district since being elected in 2010.

Republican primary

Candidates
Declared
Sean Duffy, incumbent
Don Raihala, small business owner

Results

Democratic primary

Candidates
Declared
Mary Hoeft, university professor
Joel Lewis, Marathon County Board Supervisor

Withdrew
Kirk Bangstad, political consultant
Ethel Quisler, independent contractor

Declined
Kelly Westlund, 2014 nominee

Results

General election

Results

District 8

Republican Reid Ribble had represented the district since being elected in 2010. On January 30, 2016, Ribble announced he would retire at the end of his third term, opening the seat for the 2016 election.

Republican primary

Candidates
Declared
 Mike Gallagher, retired U.S. Marine and former advisor to Governor Scott Walker
 Frank Lasee, state senator
 Terry McNulty, Forestville, Wisconsin village president, Southern Door School Board member

Withdrew
 Gary Schomburg, former Hilbert, WI village board member

Declined
 Andre Jacque, state representative
 John Macco, state representative
 John Nygren, state representative
 Roger Roth, state senator
 David Steffen, state representative* Jim Steineke, Majority Leader of State Assembly
 Chad Weininger, former state representative

Endorsements

Results

Democratic primary

Candidates
Declared
 Tom Nelson, County Executive of Outagamie County and former state representative

Declined
 Eric Genrich, state representative
 Steve Kagen, former U.S. Representative
 Penny Bernard Schaber, former state representative

Results

Independent
 Wendy Gribben, part-time grocery store employee
 Robbie Hoffman, artist and psychologist

General election

Polling

Results

References

External links
U.S. House elections in Wisconsin, 2016 at Ballotpedia
Campaign contributions at OpenSecrets

Wisconsin
2016
2016 Wisconsin elections